The British Rally Championship is a rallying series run over the course of a year, that comprises seven tarmac and gravel surface events. 2022 is to be the 64th season of the series. The season begins in Clacton, Essex on 23/24 April and is due to conclude on 29 October in the Welsh forests.

At the end of the season Osian Pryce and regular co-driver Noel O'Sullivan were declared 2022 champion driver and co-driver having won 4 out of the 7 events.

2022 calendar
For season 2022 there will be seven events, four on gravel and three on closed road tarmac surfaces. Reserve event for 2022 will take place at Oulton Park circuit in November.

Entrants

BRC1

BRC Junior

2022 events podium

2022 British Rally Championship for Drivers

Scoring system

Points are awarded as follows: 25, 18, 15, 12, 10, 8, 6, 4, 2, 1. Drivers may nominate one event as their 'joker', on which they will score additional points: 5, 4, 3, 2, 1. Competitors five best scores will count towards their championship total.

References

British Rally Championship seasons
Rally Championship
British Rally Championship